James Avila is an American television journalist, currently the Senior Law and Justice Correspondent for ABC News. He graduated from Glenbard East High School with the name of Jim Simon. 

Before joining ABC, he was a correspondent for NBC News. He frequently anchors ABC's World News Saturday.

From 1994 to 1996, Avila was the investigative reporter for local NBC station KNBC in Los Angeles where he reported on the O. J. Simpson murder case. The station won the 1995 Golden Mike Award and a 1996 Emmy Award for that trial coverage.

References

External links 
 ABC News Bio

ABC News personalities
American television reporters and correspondents
Television anchors from Chicago
Living people
Television anchors from Los Angeles
Television anchors from San Francisco
Year of birth missing (living people)